Good News is the second studio album released by German singer-songwriter Lena Meyer-Landrut. It was first released on 8 February 2011 through Universal Music, following her win of the Eurovision Song Contest in 2010. The album includes all songs performed by Meyer-Landrut during the televised preselection process for the song that she would perform at the 2011 contest to defend her title. The album debuted at number one on the German Albums Chart, becoming her second album to do so, and has been certified platinum in Germany, indicating sales of over 200,000.

Background
The album combines all the songs performed by Lena in the national final for the 2011 Eurovision Song Contest, Unser Song für Deutschland (Our song for Germany). More than 600 songs were sent to Meyer-Landrut and Raab as possible entries. Some songwriters who had previously collaborated with Lena on her debut album My Cassette Player entered songs for the contest, such as Daniel Schaub, Pär Lammers and Rosi Golan. A number of other songwriters also entered compositions, including Nicole Morier (who previously worked with Britney Spears and Tom Jones), Erroll Rennalls (who wrote the Tom Jones single Sex Bomb) and Aloe Blacc. Lena and Raab also collaborated to write two songs for the album - "What Happened to Me" and "Mama Told Me". The field of songs was reduced from over six-hundred to twelve, all of which feature on "Good News". The production of all songs began in December 2010.

The album was released on 8 February 2011 after all the songs had been revealed during the two semi-finals of the national selection process. The album cover was shot by Sandra Ludewig and the booklet was designed by Berlin design firm Eat, Sleep + Design.

At the final of Unser Song für Deutschland, "Taken by a Stranger" was chosen to represent Germany at the contest with 79% of the public vote. It was released as the album's first single on 22 February 2011.

Reception

Good News debuted at number one on the German Albums Chart in its first week of release. It also topped the German Downloads Chart in its debut week. In its second week the album dropped to number two in the German charts following the release of Roxette's comeback album, Charm School. In the second week of release, the album was certified Gold for sales of over 100,000 copies. It returned to number one in its third week of release in Germany. In Austria, Good News debuted at number eight but has since peaked at number seven. In Switzerland the album debuted on the chart at number 27, before rising the following week to number fifteen.

Following the final of the German national selection process on 18 February 2011, the winning song "Taken by a Stranger" debuted at number 2 on the German Singles Chart. The song also debuted on the Austrian and Swiss singles charts at numbers 32 and 45 respectively. Four additional tracks from the album appeared on the German singles chart following their performance on Unser Song für Deutschland based on downloads only. The song which ended up as runner-up in the contest, "Push Forward", charted at number 15; "Maybe" entered at number 53; "A Million and One" at 55; and "Mama Told Me" at 58.

Re-release
The Platinum edition of the album was released on 16 September 2011 including two new tracks, "What a Man", a Salt-n-Pepa cover which was released earlier in September, and "Who'd Want to Find Love", plus five live versions from the "Good News Tour"; "Satellite", "Taken by a Stranger", "Good News", "New Shoes" and "I Like to Bang My Head".

Track listing

Charts

Weekly charts

Year-end charts

Certifications

Release history

References

External links

 Good News on YouTube

2011 albums
Lena Meyer-Landrut albums